Chamacane (possibly from Aymara ch'amaka dark, darkness, -ni a suffix to indicate ownership, "the one with dark color") is a mountain in the Peruvian Andes, about  high. It is located in the Puno Region, Azángaro Province, on the border of the districts Muñani and San Antón. It lies northwest of the mountain Surupana and south of Alcamarine.

Chamacane is situated at the river Quellhuiri which originates northwest of the mountain. It flows to the south.

References

Mountains of Puno Region
Mountains of Peru